The Medina-class gunboat was a class of 12 Royal Navy Rendel (or "flat-iron") gunboats mounting three 6.3-inch guns, built between 1876 and 1877. Flat-iron gunboats were normally built without masts or rigging, but the Medinas carried a full barquentine rig. Their robust iron hulls meant that they lingered on as diving tenders, barges and lighters, with five of them working into the 1920s. The hull of Medway lies in shallow water in Bermuda and is visible on satellite imagery.

Design
The Medina class were a development of the Rendel (or "flat-iron") gunboat, a series of small vessels with low freeboards that mounted a small number of relatively large guns. Although the Medinas were exceptionally provided with masts to extend their range and independence, in essence they were available for similar operations to their un-masted sisters; offensive action against shore defences. Their ungainly appearance led them to be described by the naval historian Antony Preston as "the most grotesque craft ever seen". All 12 vessels of the class were built at Palmers Shipbuilding and Iron Company in Jarrow and were named after rivers. They were constructed entirely of iron and were fitted with an unusual bow rudder.

Armament
As built, ships of the class mounted three 6.3-inch (160-mm) 64-pdr 64-cwt muzzle-loading rifles.  By 1892 Trent had been fitted with a pair of 4.7-inch quick-firing guns.

Propulsion
All the ships of the class were fitted with a pair of R and W Hawthorn 2-cylinder horizontal single-expansion steam engines of 60 nominal horsepower.

Sail plan
All ships of the class were built with three masts and a barquentine rig of sails. Surviving members of the class had their sailing rig replaced by a pair of pole masts in the 1890s.

Operational lives
Spey was fitted in 1900 with three 4.7-inch guns for service at the gunnery school.

Dee and Don served in the Mediterranean in 1886 as part of an International squadron dominated by the Royal Navy. They both remained at Malta in various capacities for the rest of their lives. Esk and Tweed both served in Hong Kong in the 1890s, being sold there in the 1900s.

In all cases the crews were not expected to live on board their cramped ships when not at sea. Instead their living space was provided in accommodation hulks or the battleships to which the gunboats were tenders.

Ships

Legacy
The gunboats Dee and Don spent a number of years moored next to each other in Kalkara, Malta. This resulted in the Maltese expression id-di u d-do, which refers to two people who are frequently seen together.

References

Bibliography
 
 
 

Gunboat classes
 
Medina